The Politically Independent Alignment, alternatively translated as Politically Independent Camp or Front ( or , Politikí Anexártiti Parátaxi or Politikí Anexártitos Parátaxis, PAP) was a Greek electoral alliance that ran in the 1950 legislative election and represented loyalists of the former dictator Ioannis Metaxas.

It was established in 1949 as an alliance of the Greek Renaissance Party of Konstantinos Maniadakis, former Minister of Public Order during the 4th of August Regime, and the Nationalist Party of Theodoros Tourkovasilis, a former Governor of the Bank of Greece.

In the 1950 Greek legislative election the party gained 8,15% of the votes and 16 seats in the Hellenic Parliament.

Electoral history

References 

Defunct nationalist parties in Greece
1949 establishments in Greece
Political parties established in 1949
Neo-fascist parties
Metaxist parties